Fenomby is a rural municipality in Madagascar. It belongs to the district of Manakara, which is a part of Fitovinany. This municipality had 8,268 inhabitants in 2018.

Primary and junior level secondary education are available in town. The majority 99.5% of the population of the commune are farmers.  The most important crops are coffee and rice, while other important agricultural products are lychee and cassava. Services provide employment for 0.5% of the population.

Geography
It lies at the Fianarantsoa-Côte Est railway that links the town with Fianarantsoa and Manakara. The Faraony River has its mouth to the Indian Ocean in the municipality.

References 

Populated places in Fitovinany